Nils Björklöf (13 April 1921, Ingå – 16 September 1987) was a Finnish sprint canoeist who competed in the late 1940s. He won two bronze medals at the 1948 Summer Olympics in London, earning them in the K-2 1000 m and K-2 10000 m events.

Björklöf also won a gold medal in the K-2 500 m event at the 1948 ICF Canoe Sprint World Championships in London.

Though born in Finland, Björklöf died in Stockholm, Sweden.

Note that the K-2 500 m event did not become an official event at the Summer Olympics until the 1976 Games in Montreal. The event has been on the Olympic program since then.

References

Sports-reference.com profile

1921 births
1987 deaths
People from Ingå
Canoeists at the 1948 Summer Olympics
Finnish male canoeists
Olympic canoeists of Finland
Olympic bronze medalists for Finland
Olympic medalists in canoeing
ICF Canoe Sprint World Championships medalists in kayak
Medalists at the 1948 Summer Olympics
Sportspeople from Uusimaa